Park Range may refer to:

The Park Range in northern Colorado in the United States
The Park Range in Nevada in the United States
The Park Ranges in the Canadian Rockies